Hypostomus winzi is a species of catfish in the family Loricariidae. It is native to South America, where it occurs in the Magdalena River basin. The species reaches 4.2 cm (1.7 inches) SL and is believed to be a facultative air-breather.

References 

Hypostominae
Fish described in 1945